Glasgow Provan may refer to:

 Glasgow Provan (Scottish Parliament constituency)
 Glasgow Provan (UK Parliament constituency)